Charles Wysocki may refer to:
 Charles Wysocki (biologist)
 Charles Wysocki (artist)